Gender & Society is a peer-reviewed academic journal that covers research in the field of gender studies. The editor-in-chief is Jo Reger (Oakland University). It was established in 1987 and is currently published by SAGE Publications in association with Sociologists for Women in Society.

Introduction 
Articles appearing in Gender & Society analyze gender and gendered processes in interactions, organizations, societies, and global and transnational spaces. The journal primarily publishes empirical articles, including qualitative, quantitative, and comparative-historical methodologies.

Abstracting and indexing 
Gender & Society is abstracted and indexed in over 70 databases including Scopus and the Social Sciences Citation Index. According to Journal Citation Reports, the journal has a 2017 impact factor of 2.36, ranking it 2nd out of 42 journals in the category "Women's Studies" and 20th out of 146 journals in the category "Sociology."

See also 
 List of women's studies journals

References

External links 
 

Bimonthly journals
English-language journals
Publications established in 1987
SAGE Publishing academic journals
Sociology journals
Women's studies journals